The law of Michigan consists of several levels, including constitutional, statutory, regulatory and case law. The Michigan Compiled Laws form the general statutory law.

Sources

The Constitution of Michigan is the foremost source of state law. Legislation is enacted by the Michigan Legislature, published in the Acts of the Legislature, and codified in the Michigan Compiled Laws. State agency regulations (sometimes called administrative law) are published in the Michigan Register and codified in the Michigan Administrative Code. Michigan's legal system is based on common law, which is interpreted by case law through the decisions of the Supreme Court and Court of Appeals, which are published in the Michigan Reports and Michigan Appeals Reports, respectively.

Constitution
The foremost source of state law is the Constitution of Michigan. The Michigan Constitution in turn is subordinate to the Constitution of the United States, which is the supreme law of the land.

Legislation
Pursuant to the state constitution, the Michigan Legislature has enacted legislation. These legislative acts are published in the official Public and Local Acts of the Legislature of the State of Michigan and are called "session laws". They in turn have been codified in the Michigan Compiled Laws. Both are published by the Michigan Legislative Service Bureau (LSB). Pursuant to Article IV, Section 36, of the Michigan Constitution, the compilations and codifications are not binding.

Regulations
Pursuant to certain statutes, state agencies have promulgated regulations, also known as administrative law. The regulations are published in the Michigan Register (MR) and codified in the Michigan Administrative Code (MAC or AC). The Michigan Administrative Code was last printed in 1979. The Annual Administrative Code Supplement (AACS) is the annual supplement to the Michigan Administrative Code containing the rules published in the Michigan Register for that year. All three works are published by the Michigan Office of Regulatory Reinvention within the Michigan Department of Licensing and Regulatory Affairs. From 1980–1997, the AACS was published by the LSB.

Case law

The legal system of Michigan is based on the common law. Like all U.S. states except Louisiana, Michigan has a reception statute providing for the "reception" of English law. All statutes, regulations, and ordinances are subject to judicial review. Pursuant to common law tradition, the courts of Michigan have developed a large body of case law through the decisions of the Michigan Supreme Court and Michigan Court of Appeals.

The decisions of the Supreme Court and Court of Appeals are published in the Michigan Reports and Michigan Appeals Reports, respectively. Both are also reported in the unofficial Michigan Reporter (a Michigan-specific version of the North Western Reporter).

Local ordinances

Compiled Laws
The Michigan Compiled Laws (MCL) are the official codification of statutes for the state of Michigan. An unannotated edition of the MCL is published by the state of Michigan in print and online.

Unofficial, annotated versions are published by both West and LexisNexis.  The West publication is Michigan Compiled Laws Annotated (MCLA); the LexisNexis version is the Michigan Compiled Laws Service (MCLS).

Until the year 2000, an alternate codification known as the Michigan Statutes Annotated (MSA), which differed from the MCL in both its organization and numbering system, was also in use.  Until the discontinuation of the MSA by LexisNexis, Michigan Court Rules required citation to both the MCL and MSA in all court filings.

See also

Topics
 Capital punishment in Michigan
 Felony murder rule (Michigan)
 Gun laws in Michigan
 LGBT rights in Michigan

Other
 Politics of Michigan
 List of law enforcement agencies in Michigan
 Crime in Michigan
 Law of the United States
 United States Code

References

External links
 Michigan Compiled Laws from the Michigan Legislative Service Bureau
 Michigan Administrative Code from the Michigan Department of Licensing and Regulatory Affairs
 Public Acts of the Michigan Legislature from the Michigan Legislative Service Bureau
 Michigan Register from the Michigan Department of Licensing and Regulatory Affairs
 Court cases, opinions and orders from the Michigan State Court Administrative Office
 Wayne County Code from Municode
 Detroit City Code from Municode
 Local ordinance codes from Public.Resource.Org
 Case law: 

 
Michigan